The Beatbox Battle World Championship (BBBWC) is hosted triennially (every three years) hosted by Beatbox Battle Tv in a week-long festival held in Berlin, Germany. Face-to-face beatbox battles take place in five different categories:- individual male, individual female, tag-team,  loop station and crew battle. In 2015, more than 150 national or major event champions of beatboxing gathered from 50 or so countries, after qualifying to participate in the world event by winning their respective national championships.

The sixth Beatbox Battle World Championship will be held in Berlin, Germany from 2nd to 6th August 2023. and will include individual male, individual female, tag-team,  loop station and crew battle, also two new categories: Best new sound FX and Best vocal scratching.

BBBWC Gallery

History
The first ever Beatbox Battle World Championship was started in 2005 by Alexander “BeeLow” Bülow and took place in 2005 in Leipzig, Germany.  The event was the first international beatboxing championship.

The second Beatbox Battle World Championship, took place at the 2BE Club am Hauptbahnhof near Berlin-Central Station in 2009.

The 3rd BBBWC in 2012, the 4th in 2015 and the 5th in 2018 were held at the Astra Kulturhaus in Friedrichshain-Kreuzberg, Berlin. In 2012, over 1000 people attended the event and over 100,000 people viewed the event live online.

In 2018, more than 150 artists from 6 continents and 50 countries qualified for the event, including musicians from Argentina, Australia, Brazil, Canada, Chile, China, Colombia, Ecuador, Indonesia, Japan, Malaysia, Mexico, Morocco, New Zealand, Peru, Philippines, Singapore, Venezuela, Vietnam, South Africa, Russia, South Korea, Taiwan, United States,  + 26 European countries were invited to perform in front of around 1,500 spectators.

Event format and qualification
All competitors have had to qualify for the Beatbox Battle World Championship by winning their national Beatbox Battle championships, or having reached the knock-out stages of the previous Beatbox Battle World Championship, wildcard or special invitation.
In the first round, each performer has two minutes time to demonstrate their skills to an international panel of elite judges from the beatboxing world, (such as Reeps One of England) and previous world champions from this tournament, to decide which performers qualify for the Knock-out rounds that are contested in ‘battle mode’ to determine the world champion. The judges base their decision on musicality, technicality, originality, pattern and show quality on the stage.

Wildcards
To qualify for the tournament, a beatboxer has to qualify by winning their national championships. however, there are exceptions to this rule.
Some international events are also recognized by the World Championship committee. This was the case for Gene Shinozaki and Dharni, winners of the Grand Beatbox Battles, were invited to compete in the World Championships 2015. There was also a wildcard competition for 2018, where wannabe contenders entered a video for judgement to win a place at the 2018 BBBWC. The results of the 2018 Wildcard event were as follows:

 Audical  Mens Solo winner
 Madox  Mens Solo 2nd Place
 Cosmin  Mens Solo 3rd Place
 So-So  Loopstation winner
 BreZ  Loopstation 2nd place
-- Ed Sanderson (UK) The EU bubadub 1st place

BBBWC results

thumb|right|Chris Celiz from "Spider Horse" Tag Team World Champions 2018

Qualifying history BBBWC 2018

See also
List of beatboxers
UK Beatbox Championships
Breath Control: The History of the Human Beat Box
Mouth drumming
Grand Beatbox Battle

References

External links

 Swissbeatbox - World beatbox platform
 Beatbox Battle - organizer of the BBWC world championships
 Humanbeatbox - One of the first beatboxing online-communities
 Documentary on 1st ever Beatbox Battle World Championship in 2005

Beatboxing
World championships
Recurring events established in 2005